The Beach Boys are an American rock band that formed in Hawthorne, California, in 1961. The group's original lineup consisted of brothers Brian, Dennis, and Carl Wilson, their cousin Mike Love, and friend Al Jardine. Distinguished by their vocal harmonies,  adolescent-themed lyrics, and  musical ingenuity, they are one of the most influential acts of the rock era. They drew on the music of older pop vocal groups, 1950s rock and roll, and black R&B to create their unique sound. Under Brian's direction, they often incorporated classical or jazz elements and unconventional recording techniques in innovative ways.

The Beach Boys began as a garage band, managed by the Wilsons' father, Murry, with Brian serving as composer, arranger, producer, and de facto leader. In 1963, they enjoyed their first national hit with "Surfin' U.S.A.", beginning a string of top-ten singles that reflected a southern California youth culture of surfing, cars, and romance, dubbed the "California sound". They were one of the few American rock bands to sustain their commercial standing during the British Invasion. Starting with 1965's The Beach Boys Today!, they abandoned beachgoing themes for more personal lyrics and ambitious orchestrations. In 1966, the Pet Sounds album and "Good Vibrations" single raised the group's prestige as rock innovators. After scrapping the Smile album in 1967, Brian gradually ceded control of the group to his bandmates.

In the late 1960s, the group's commercial momentum faltered in the US, and despite efforts to maintain an experimental sound, they were widely dismissed by the early rock music press. After Carl took over as  musical leader, the band made records that would later enjoy a cult following among fans. In the mid-1970s, as their concerts drew larger audiences, the band transitioned into an oldies act. Dennis drowned in 1983 and Brian soon became estranged from the group. Following Carl's death from lung cancer in 1998, the band granted Love legal rights to tour under the group's name. In the early 2010s, the original members briefly reunited for the band's 50th anniversary. , Brian and Jardine do not perform with Love's edition of the Beach Boys, but remain official members of the band.

The Beach Boys are one of the most critically acclaimed and commercially successful bands of all time, selling over 100 million records worldwide. They helped legitimize popular music as a recognized art form and influenced the development of music genres and movements such as psychedelia, power pop, progressive rock, punk, alternative, and lo-fi. Between the 1960s and 2020s, the group had 37 songs reach the US Top 40 (the most by an American band), with four topping the Billboard Hot 100. In 2004, they were ranked number 12 on Rolling Stones list of the greatest artists of all time. The founding members were inducted into the Rock and Roll Hall of Fame in 1988.

History

1958–1961: Formation 

At the time of his 16th birthday on June 20, 1958, Brian Wilson shared a bedroom with his brothers, Dennis and Carlaged 13 and 11, respectivelyin their family home in Hawthorne. He had watched his father Murry Wilson play piano, and had listened intently to the harmonies of vocal groups such as the Four Freshmen. After dissecting songs such as "Ivory Tower" and "Good News", Brian would teach family members how to sing the background harmonies. For his birthday that year, Brian received a reel-to-reel tape recorder. He learned how to overdub, using his vocals and those of Carl and their mother. Brian played piano with Carl and David Marks, an eleven-year-old longtime neighbor, playing guitars they had each received as Christmas presents.

Soon Brian and Carl were avidly listening to Johnny Otis' KFOX radio show. Inspired by the simple structure and vocals of the rhythm and blues songs he heard, Brian changed his piano-playing style and started writing songs. Family gatherings brought the Wilsons in contact with cousin Mike Love. Brian taught Love's sister Maureen and a friend harmonies. Later, Brian, Love and two friends performed at Hawthorne High School. Brian also knew Al Jardine, a high school classmate. Brian suggested to Jardine that they team up with his cousin and brother Carl. Love gave the fledgling band its name: "The Pendletones", a pun on "Pendleton", a style of woolen shirt popular at the time. Dennis was the only avid surfer in the group, and he suggested that the group write songs that celebrated the sport and the lifestyle that it had inspired in Southern California. Brian finished the song, titled "Surfin", and with Mike Love, wrote "Surfin' Safari".

Murry Wilson, who was a sometime songwriter, arranged for the Pendletones to meet his publisher Hite Morgan. He said: "Finally, [Hite] agreed to hear it, and Mrs. Morgan said 'Drop everything, we're going to record your song. I think it's good.' And she's the one responsible." On September 15, 1961, the band recorded a demo of "Surfin with the Morgans. A more professional recording was made on October 3, at World Pacific Studio in Hollywood. David Marks was not present at the session as he was in school that day. Murry brought the demos to Herb Newman, owner of Candix Records and Era Records, and he signed the group on December 8. When the single was released a few weeks later, the band found that they had been renamed "the Beach Boys". Candix wanted to name the group the Surfers until Russ Regan, a young promoter with Era Records, noted that there already existed a group by that name. He suggested calling them the Beach Boys. "Surfin was a regional success for the West Coast, and reached number 75 on the national Billboard Hot 100 chart. It was so successful that the number of unpaid orders for the single bankrupted Candix.

1962–1967: Peak years

Surfin' Safari, Surfin' U.S.A., Surfer Girl, and Little Deuce Coupe

By this time the de facto manager of the Beach Boys, Murry landed the group's first paying gig (for which they earned $300) on New Year's Eve, 1961, at the Ritchie Valens Memorial Dance in Long Beach. In their earliest public appearances, the band wore heavy wool jacket-like shirts that local surfers favored before switching to their trademark striped shirts and white pants (a look that was taken directly from the Kingston Trio). In early 1962, Morgan requested that some of the members add vocals to a couple of instrumental tracks that he had recorded with other musicians. This led to the creation of the short-lived group Kenny & the Cadets, which Brian led under the pseudonym "Kenny". The other members were Carl, Jardine, and the Wilsons' mother Audree. In February, Jardine left the Beach Boys and was replaced by David Marks.

After being turned down by Dot and Liberty, the Beach Boys signed a seven-year contract with Capitol Records. This was at the urging of Capitol executive and staff producer Nick Venet who signed the group, seeing them as the "teenage gold" he had been scouting for. On June 4, 1962, the Beach Boys debuted on Capitol with their second single, "Surfin' Safari" backed with "409". The release prompted national coverage in the June 9 issue of Billboard, which praised Love's lead vocal and said the song had potential. "Surfin' Safari" rose to number 14 and found airplay in New York and Phoenix, a surprise for the label.

The Beach Boys' first album, Surfin' Safari, was released in October 1962. It was different from other rock albums of the time in that it consisted almost entirely of original songs, primarily written by Brian with Mike Love and friend Gary Usher. Another unusual feature of the Beach Boys was that, although they were marketed as "surf music", their repertoire bore little resemblance to the music of other surf bands, which was mainly instrumental and incorporated heavy use of spring reverb. For this reason, some of the Beach Boys' early local performances had young audience members throwing vegetables at the band, believing that the group were poseurs.

In January 1963, the Beach Boys recorded their first top-ten single, "Surfin' U.S.A.", which began their long run of highly successful recording efforts. It was during the sessions for this single that Brian made the production decision from that point on to use double tracking on the group's vocals, resulting in a deeper and more resonant sound. The album of the same name followed in March and reached number 2 on the Billboard charts. Its success propelled the group into a nationwide spotlight, and was vital to launching surf music as a national craze, albeit the Beach Boys' vocal approach to the genre, not the original instrumental style pioneered by Dick Dale.  Biographer Luis Sanchez highlights the "Surfin' U.S.A." single as a turning point for the band, "creat[ing] a direct passage to California life for a wide teenage audience ... [and] a distinct Southern California sensibility that exceeded its conception as such to advance right to the front of American consciousness."

Throughout 1963, and for the next few years, Brian produced a variety of singles for outside artists. Among these were the Honeys, a surfer trio that comprised sisters Diane and Marilyn Rovell with cousin Ginger Blake. Brian was convinced that they could be a successful female counterpart to the Beach Boys, and he produced a number of singles for them, although they could not replicate the Beach Boys' popularity. He also attended some of Phil Spector's sessions at Gold Star Studios. His creative and songwriting interests were revamped upon hearing the Ronettes' 1963 song "Be My Baby", which was produced by Spector. The first time he heard the song was while driving, and was so overwhelmed that he had to pull over to the side of the road and analyze the chorus. Later, he reflected: "I was unable to really think as a producer up until the time where I really got familiar with Phil Spector's work. That was when I started to design the experience to be a record rather than just a song."

Surfer Girl marked the first time the group used outside musicians on a substantial portion of an LP. Many of them were the musicians Spector used for his Wall of Sound productions. Only a month after Surfer Girl'''s release the group's fourth album Little Deuce Coupe was issued. To close 1963, the band released a standalone Christmas-themed single, "Little Saint Nick", backed with an a cappella rendition of the scriptural song "The Lord's Prayer". The A-side peaked at No. 3 on the US Billboard Christmas chart. By the end of the year David Marks had left the group and Al Jardine had returned.

British Invasion, Shut Down Volume 2, All Summer Long, and Christmas Album 
The surf music craze, along with the careers of nearly all surf acts, was slowly replaced by the British Invasion. Following a successful Australasian tour in January and February 1964, the Beach Boys returned home to face their new competition, the Beatles. Both groups shared the same record label in the US, and Capitol's support for the Beach Boys immediately began waning. Although it generated a top-five single in "Fun Fun Fun", the group's fifth album, Shut Down Volume 2, became their first since Surfin' Safari not to reach the US top-ten. This caused Murry to fight for the band at the label more than before, often visiting their offices without warning to "twist executive arms". Carl said that Phil Spector "was Brian's favorite kind of rock; he liked [him] better than the early Beatles stuff. He loved the Beatles' later music when they evolved and started making intelligent, masterful music, but before that Phil was it." According to Mike Love, Carl followed the Beatles closer than anyone else in the band, while Brian was the most "rattled" by the Beatles and felt tremendous pressure to "keep pace" with them. For Brian, the Beatles ultimately "eclipsed a lot [of what] we'd worked for ... [they] eclipsed the whole music world."

Brian wrote his last surf song in April 1964. That month, during recording of the single "I Get Around", Murry was relieved of his duties as manager. He remained in close contact with the group and attempted to continue advising on their career decisions.  When "I Get Around" was released in May, it would climb to No. 1 in the US and Canada, their first single to do so (also reaching the Top 10 in Sweden and the UK), proving that the Beach Boys could compete with contemporary British pop groups. In July, the album that the song appeared on, All Summer Long, reached No. 4 in the US. All Summer Long introduced exotic textures to the Beach Boys' sound exemplified by the piccolos and xylophones of its title track. The album was a swan-song to the surf and car music the Beach Boys built their commercial standing upon. Later albums took a different stylistic and lyrical path. Before this, a live album, Beach Boys Concert, was released in October to a four-week chart stay at No. 1, containing a set list of previously recorded songs and covers that they had not yet recorded.

In June 1964, Brian recorded the bulk of The Beach Boys' Christmas Album with a forty-one-piece studio orchestra in collaboration with Four Freshmen arranger Dick Reynolds. The album was a response to Phil Spector's A Christmas Gift for You (1963). Released in December, the Beach Boys' album was divided between five new, original Christmas-themed songs, and seven reinterpretations of traditional Christmas songs. It would be regarded as one of the finest holiday albums of the rock era. One single from the album, "The Man with All the Toys", was released, peaking at No. 6 on the US Billboard Christmas chart. On October 29, the Beach Boys performed for The T.A.M.I. Show, a concert film intended to bring together a wide range of musicians for a one-off performance. The result was released to movie theaters one month later.

Today!, Summer Days, and Party!
By the end of 1964, the stress of road travel, writing, and producing became too much for Brian. On December 23, while on a flight from Los Angeles to Houston, he suffered a panic attack. In January 1965, he announced his withdrawal from touring to concentrate entirely on songwriting and record production. For the rest of 1964 and into 1965, session musician Glen Campbell served as Brian's temporary replacement in concert. Carl took over as the band's musical director onstage. Now a full-time studio artist, Brian wanted to move the Beach Boys beyond their surf aesthetic, believing that their image was antiquated and distracting the public from his talents as a producer and songwriter. Musically, he said he began to "take the things I learned from Phil Spector and use more instruments whenever I could. I doubled up on basses and tripled up on keyboards, which made everything sound bigger and deeper."

Released in March 1965, The Beach Boys Today! marked the first time the group experimented with the "album-as-art" form. The tracks on side one feature an uptempo sound that contrasts side two, which consists mostly of emotional ballads. Music writer Scott Schinder referenced its "suite-like structure" as an early example of the rock album format being used to make a cohesive artistic statement. Brian also established his new lyrical approach toward the autobiographical; journalist Nick Kent wrote that the subjects of Brian's songs "were suddenly no longer simple happy souls harmonizing their sun-kissed innocence and dying devotion to each other over a honey-coated backdrop of surf and sand. Instead, they'd become highly vulnerable, slightly neurotic and riddled with telling insecurities." In the book Yeah Yeah Yeah: The Story of Modern Pop, Bob Stanley remarked that "Brian was aiming for Johnny Mercer but coming up proto-indie."  In 2012, the album was voted 271 on Rolling Stone magazine's list of the 500 Greatest Albums of All Time.

In April 1965, Campbell's own career success pulled him from touring with the group. Columbia Records staff producer Bruce Johnston was asked to locate a replacement for Campbell; having failed to find one, Johnston himself became a full-time member of the band on May 19, 1965, first replacing Brian on the road and later contributing in the studio, beginning with the June 4 vocal sessions for "California Girls", which first appeared in the band's next album Summer Days (And Summer Nights!!) and eventually charted at number three in the US while the album went to number two. The album also included a reworked arrangement of "Help Me, Rhonda" which became the band's second number one US single in the spring of 1965.

To appease Capitol's demands for a Beach Boys LP for the 1965 Christmas season, Brian conceived Beach Boys' Party!, a live-in-the-studio album consisting mostly of acoustic covers of 1950s rock and R&B songs, in addition to covers of three Beatles songs, Bob Dylan's "The Times They Are a-Changin'", and idiosyncratic rerecordings of the group's earlier songs. The album was an early precursor of the "unplugged" trend. It included a cover of the Regents' song "Barbara Ann" which unexpectedly reached number two when released several weeks later. In November, the group released another top-twenty single, "The Little Girl I Once Knew". It was considered the band's most experimental statement thus far. The single continued Brian's ambitions for daring arrangements, featuring unexpected tempo changes and numerous false endings. It was the band's second single not to reach the US top ten since their 1962 breakthrough, peaking at number 20. According to Luis Sanchez, in 1965, Bob Dylan was "rewriting the rules for pop success" with his music and image, and it was at this juncture that Wilson "led The Beach Boys into a transitional phase in an effort to win the pop terrain that had been thrown up for grabs."

 Pet Sounds 

Wilson collaborated with jingle writer Tony Asher for several of the songs on the album Pet Sounds, a refinement of the themes and ideas that were introduced in Today!. In some ways, the music was a jarring departure from their earlier style. Jardine explained that "it took us quite a while to adjust to [the new material] because it wasn't music you could necessarily dance to—it was more like music you could make love to."  In The Journal on the Art of Record Production, Marshall Heiser writes that Pet Sounds "diverges from previous Beach Boys' efforts in several ways: its sound field has a greater sense of depth and 'warmth;' the songs employ even more inventive use of harmony and chord voicings; the prominent use of percussion is a key feature (as opposed to driving drum backbeats); whilst the orchestrations, at times, echo the quirkiness of 'exotica' bandleader Les Baxter, or the 'cool' of Burt Bacharach, more so than Spector's teen fanfares."

For Pet Sounds, Brian desired to make "a complete statement", similar to what he believed the Beatles had done with their newest album Rubber Soul, released in December 1965. Brian was immediately enamored with the album, given the impression that it had no filler tracks, a feature that was mostly unheard of at a time when 45 rpm singles were considered more noteworthy than full-length LPs. He later said: "It didn't make me want to copy them but to be as good as them. I didn't want to do the same kind of music, but on the same level." Thanks to mutual connections, Brian was introduced to the Beatles' former press officer Derek Taylor, who was subsequently employed as the Beach Boys' publicist. Responding to Brian's request to reinvent the band's image, Taylor devised a promotion campaign with the tagline "Brian Wilson is a genius", a belief Taylor sincerely held. Taylor's prestige was crucial in offering a credible perspective to those on the outside, and his efforts are widely recognized as instrumental in the album's success in Britain.

Released on May 16, 1966, Pet Sounds was widely influential and raised the band's prestige as an innovative rock group. Early reviews for the album in the US ranged from negative to tentatively positive, and its sales numbered approximately 500,000 units, a drop-off from the run of albums that immediately preceded it. It was assumed that Capitol considered Pet Sounds a risk, appealing more to an older demographic than the younger, female audience upon which the Beach Boys had built their commercial standing. Within two months, the label capitulated by releasing the group's first greatest hits compilation, Best of the Beach Boys, which was quickly certified gold by the RIAA. By contrast, Pet Sounds met a highly favorable critical response in Britain, where it reached number 2 and remained among the top-ten positions for six months. Responding to the hype, Melody Maker ran a feature in which many pop musicians were asked whether they believed that the album was truly revolutionary and progressive, or "as sickly as peanut butter". The author concluded that "the record's impact on artists and the men behind the artists has been considerable."

In its evaluation of Pet Sounds, the book 101 Albums that Changed Popular Music (2009) calls it "one of the most innovative recordings in rock", and states that it "elevated Brian Wilson from talented bandleader to studio genius". In 1995, a panel of numerous musicians, songwriters and producers assembled by Mojo voted Pet Sounds the greatest record ever made. Paul McCartney frequently spoke of his affinity with the album, citing "God Only Knows" as his favorite song of all time, and crediting it with furthering his interest in devising melodic bass lines. He said that Pet Sounds was the primary impetus for the Beatles' 1967 album Sgt. Pepper's Lonely Hearts Club Band. According to author Carys Wyn Jones, the interplay between the two groups during the Pet Sounds era remains one of the most noteworthy episodes in rock history. In 2003, when Rolling Stone magazine created its list of the "500 Greatest Albums of All Time", the publication placed Pet Sounds second to honour its influence on the highest-ranked album, Sgt. Pepper.

 "Good Vibrations" and Smile

Throughout the summer of 1966, Brian concentrated on finishing the group's next single, "Good Vibrations". Instead of working on whole songs with clear large-scale syntactical structures, he limited himself to recording short interchangeable fragments (or "modules"). Through the method of tape splicing, each fragment could then be assembled into a linear sequence, allowing any number of larger structures and divergent moods to be produced at a later time. Coming at a time when pop singles were usually recorded in under two hours, it was one of the most complex pop productions ever undertaken, with sessions for the song stretching over several months in four major Hollywood studios. It was also the most expensive single ever recorded to that point, with production costs estimated to be in the tens of thousands.

In the midst of "Good Vibrations" sessions, Wilson invited session musician and songwriter Van Dyke Parks to collaborate as lyricist for the Beach Boys' next album project, soon titled Smile. Parks agreed. Wilson and Parks intended Smile to be a continuous suite of songs linked both thematically and musically, with the main songs linked together by small vocal pieces and instrumental segments that elaborated on the major songs' musical themes. It was explicitly American in style and subject, a conscious reaction to the overwhelming British dominance of popular music at the time. Some of the music incorporated chanting, cowboy songs, explorations in Indian and Hawaiian music, jazz, classical tone poems, cartoon sound effects, musique concrète, and yodeling. Saturday Evening Post writer Jules Siegel recalled that, on one October evening, Brian announced to his wife and friends that he was "writing a teenage symphony to God".

Recording for Smile lasted about a year, from mid-1966 to mid-1967, and followed the same modular production approach as "Good Vibrations". Concurrently, Wilson planned many different multimedia side projects, such as a sound effects collage, a comedy album, and a "health food" album. Capitol did not support all these ideas, which led to the Beach Boys' desire to form their own label, Brother Records. According to biographer Steven Gaines, Wilson employed his newfound "best friend" David Anderle as head of the label.

Throughout 1966, EMI flooded the UK market with previously unreleased Beach Boys albums, including Beach Boys' Party!, The Beach Boys Today! and Summer Days (and Summer Nights!!), and Best of the Beach Boys was number two there for several weeks at the end of the year. Over the final quarter of 1966, the Beach Boys were the highest-selling album act in the UK, where for the first time in three years American artists broke the chart dominance of British acts. In 1971, Cue magazine wrote that, from mid-1966 to late 1967, the Beach Boys "were among the vanguard in practically every aspect of the counter culture".

Released on October 10, 1966, "Good Vibrations" was the Beach Boys' third US number-one single, reaching the top of the Billboard Hot 100 in December, and became their first number one in Britain. That month, the record was their first single certified gold by the RIAA. It came to be widely acclaimed as one of the greatest masterpieces of rock music. In December 1966, the Beach Boys were voted the top band in the world in the NMEs annual readers' poll, ahead of the Beatles, the Walker Brothers, the Rolling Stones, and the Four Tops.

Throughout the first half of 1967, the album's release date was repeatedly postponed as Brian tinkered with the recordings, experimenting with different takes and mixes, unable or unwilling to supply a final version. Meanwhile, he suffered from delusions and paranoia, believing on one occasion that the would-be album track "Fire" caused a building to burn down. On January 3, 1967, Carl Wilson refused to be drafted for military service, leading to indictment and criminal prosecution, which he challenged as a conscientious objector. The FBI arrested him in April, and it took several years for courts to resolve the matter.

After months of recording and media hype, Smile was shelved for personal, technical, and legal reasons. A February 1967 lawsuit seeking $255,000 (equivalent to $ in ) was launched against Capitol Records over neglected royalty payments. Within the lawsuit was an attempt to terminate the band's contract with Capitol before its November 1969 expiry. Many of Wilson's associates, including Parks and Anderle, disassociated themselves from the group by April 1967. Brian later said: "Time can be spent in the studio to the point where you get so next to it, you don't know where you are with it—you decide to just chuck it for a while."

In the decades following Smiles non-release, it became the subject of intense speculation and mystique and the most legendary unreleased album in pop music history. Many of the album's advocates believe that had it been released, it would have altered the group's direction and cemented them at the vanguard of rock innovators. In 2011, Uncut magazine staff voted Smile the "greatest bootleg recording of all time".

 1967–1969: Faltered popularity and Brian's reduced involvement

Smiley Smile and Wild Honey
From 1965 to 1967, the Beach Boys had developed a musical and lyrical sophistication that contrasted their work from before and after. This divide was further solidified by the difference in sound between their albums and their stage performances. This resulted in a split fanbase corresponding to two distinct musical markets. One group enjoys the band's early work as a wholesome representation of American popular culture from before the political and social movements brought on in the mid-1960s. The other group also appreciates the early songs for their energy and complexity, but not as much as the band's ambitious work that was created during the formative psychedelic era. At the time, rock music journalists typically valued the Beach Boys' early records over their experimental work.

In May 1967, the Beach Boys attempted to tour Europe with four extra musicians brought from the US, but were stopped by the British musicians' union. The tour went on without the extra support, and critics described their performances as "amateurish" and "floundering". At the last minute, the Beach Boys declined to headline the  Monterey Pop Festival, an event held in June. According to David Leaf, "Monterey was a gathering place for the 'far out' sounds of the 'new' rock ... and it is thought that [their] non-appearance was what really turned the 'underground' tide against them." Fan magazines speculated that the group was on the verge of breaking up. Detractors called the band the "Bleach Boys" and "the California Hypes" as media focus shifted from Los Angeles to the happenings in San Francisco. As authenticity became a higher concern among critics, the group's legitimacy in rock music became an oft-repeated criticism, especially since their early songs appeared to celebrate a politically unconscious youth culture.

Although Smile had been cancelled, the Beach Boys were still under pressure and a contractual obligation to record and present an album to Capitol. Carl remembered: "Brian just said, 'I can't do this. We're going to make a homespun version of [Smile] instead. We're just going to take it easy. I'll get in the pool and sing. Or let's go in the gym and do our parts.' That was Smiley Smile." Sessions for the new album lasted from June to July 1967 at Brian's new makeshift home studio. Most of the album featured the Beach Boys playing their own instruments, rather than the session musicians employed in much of their previous work. It was the first album for which production was credited to the entire group instead of Brian alone.

In July 1967, lead single "Heroes and Villains" was issued, arriving after months of public anticipation, and reached number 12 in US. It was met with general confusion and underwhelming reviews, and in the NME, Jimi Hendrix famously dismissed it as a "psychedelic barbershop quartet". By then, the group's lawsuit with Capitol was resolved, and it was agreed that Smile would not be the band's next album. In August, the group embarked on a two-date tour of Hawaii. Bruce Johnston, who was absent for most of the Smiley Smile recording, did not accompany the group, but Brian did. The performances were filmed and recorded with the intention of releasing a live album, Lei'd in Hawaii, which was also left unfinished and unreleased.  The general record-buying public came to view the music made after this time as the point marking the band's artistic decline.Smiley Smile was released on September 18, 1967, and peaked at number 41 in the US, making it their worst-selling album to that date. Critics and fans were generally underwhelmed by the album. According to Scott Schinder, the album was released to "general incomprehension. While Smile may have divided the Beach Boys' fans had it been released, Smiley Smile merely baffled them." The group was virtually blacklisted by the music press, to the extent that reviews of the group's records were either withheld from publication or published long after the release dates.  When released in the UK in November, it performed better, reaching number 9.  Over the years, the album gathered a reputation as one of the best "chill-out" albums to listen to during an LSD comedown. In 1974, NME voted it the 64th-greatest album of all time.

The Beach Boys immediately recorded a new album, Wild Honey, an excursion into soul music, and a self-conscious attempt to "regroup" themselves as a rock band in opposition to their more orchestral affairs of the past. Its music differs in many ways from previous Beach Boys records: it contains very little group singing compared to previous albums, and mainly features Brian singing at his piano. Again, the Beach Boys recorded mostly at his home studio. Love reflected that Wild Honey was "completely out of the mainstream for what was going on at that time ... and that was the idea."Wild Honey was released on December 18, 1967, in competition with the Beatles' Magical Mystery Tour and the Rolling Stones' Their Satanic Majesties Request. It had a higher chart placing than Smiley Smile, but still failed to make the top-twenty and remained on the charts for only 15 weeks. As with Smiley Smile, contemporary critics viewed it as inconsequential, and it alienated fans whose expectations had been raised by Smile. That month, Mike Love told a British journalist: "Brian has been rethinking our recording program and in any case we all have a much greater say nowadays in what we turn out in the studio."

Friends, 20/20, and Manson affair
The Beach Boys were at their lowest popularity in the late 1960s, and their cultural standing was especially worsened by their public image, which remained incongruous with their peers' "heavier" music. At the end of 1967, Rolling Stone co-founder and editor Jann Wenner printed an influential article that denounced the Beach Boys as "just one prominent example of a group that has gotten hung up on trying to catch The Beatles. It's a pointless pursuit." The article had the effect of excluding the group among serious rock fans and such controversy followed them into the next year. Capitol continued to bill them as "America's Top Surfin' Group!" and expected Brian to write more beachgoing songs for the yearly summer markets. From 1968 onward, his songwriting output declined substantially, but the public narrative of "Brian as leader" continued. The group also stopped wearing their longtime striped-shirt stage uniforms in favor of matching white, polyester suits that resembled a Las Vegas show band's.

After meeting Maharishi Mahesh Yogi at a UNICEF Variety Gala in Paris, Love and other high-profile celebrities such as the Beatles and Donovan traveled to Rishikesh, India, in February–March 1968. The following Beach Boys album, Friends, had songs influenced by the Transcendental Meditation the Maharishi taught. In support of Friends, Love arranged for the Beach Boys to tour with the Maharishi in the U.S. Starting on May 3, 1968, the tour lasted five shows and was canceled when the Maharishi withdrew to fulfill film contracts. Because of disappointing audience numbers and the Maharishi's withdrawal, 24 tour dates were canceled at a cost estimated at $250,000. Friends, released on June 24, peaked at number 126 in the US. In August, Capitol issued a collection of Beach Boys backing tracks, Stack-o-Tracks. It was the first Beach Boys LP that failed to chart in the US and UK.

In June 1968, Dennis befriended Charles Manson, an aspiring singer-songwriter, and their relationship lasted for several months. Dennis bought him time at Brian's home studio, where recording sessions were attempted while Brian stayed in his room. Dennis then proposed that Manson be signed to Brother Records. Brian reportedly disliked Manson, and a deal was never made. In July 1968, the group released a standalone single, "Do It Again", in the style of their earlier songs. Around this time, Brian admitted himself to a psychiatric hospital; his bandmates wrote and produced material in his absence. Released in January 1969, the album 20/20 consisted mostly of outtakes and leftovers from recent albums; Brian produced virtually none of the newer recordings.

The Beach Boys recorded one song by Manson without his involvement: "Cease to Exist", rewritten as "Never Learn Not to Love", which was included on 20/20.  As his cult of followers took over Dennis's home, Dennis gradually distanced himself from Manson. According to Leaf, "The entire Wilson family reportedly feared for their lives."

In August, the Manson Family committed the Tate–LaBianca murders. According to Jon Parks, the band's tour manager, it was widely suspected in the Hollywood community that Manson was responsible for the murders, and it had been known that Manson had been involved with the Beach Boys, causing the band to be viewed as pariahs for a time. In November, police apprehended Manson, and his connection with the Beach Boys received media attention. He was later convicted for several counts of murder and conspiracy to murder.

Selling of the band's publishing

In April 1969, the band revisited its 1967 lawsuit against Capitol after it alleged an audit revealed the band was owed over $2 million for unpaid royalties and production duties. In May, Brian told the music press that the group's funds were depleted to the point that it was considering filing for bankruptcy at the end of the year, which Disc & Music Echo called "stunning news" and a "tremendous shock on the American pop scene". Brian hoped that the success of a forthcoming single, "Break Away", would mend the financial issues. The song, written and produced by Brian and Murry, reached number 63 in the US and number 6 in the UK, and Brian's remarks to the press ultimately thwarted long-simmering contract negotiations with Deutsche Grammophon. The group's Capitol contract expired two weeks later with one more album still due. Live in London, a live album recorded in December 1968, was released in several countries in 1970 to fulfil the contract, although it would not see U.S. release until 1976. After the contract was completed Capitol deleted the Beach Boys' catalog from print, effectively cutting off their royalty flow. The lawsuit was later settled in their favor and they acquired the rights to their post-1965 catalog.

In August, Sea of Tunes, the Beach Boys' catalog, was sold to Irving Almo Music for $700,000 (equivalent to $ in ). According to his wife, Marilyn Wilson, Brian was devastated by the sale. Over the years, the catalog generated more than $100 million in publishing royalties, none of which Murry or the band members ever received. That same month, Carl, Dennis, Love, and Jardine sought a permanent replacement for Johnston, with Johnston unaware of this search. They approached Carl's brother-in-law Billy Hinsche, who declined the offer to focus on his college studies.

1970–1978: Reprise era

Sunflower, Surf's Up, Carl and the Passions, and Holland

The group was signed to Reprise Records in 1970. Scott Schinder described the label as "probably the hippest and most artist-friendly major label of the time." The deal was brokered by Van Dyke Parks, who was then employed as a multimedia executive at Warner Music Group. Reprise's contract stipulated Brian's proactive involvement with the band in all albums. By the time the Beach Boys' tenure ended with Capitol in 1969, they had sold 65 million records worldwide, closing the decade as the most commercially successful American group in popular music.

After recording over 30 different songs and going through several album titles, their first LP for Reprise, Sunflower, was released on August 31, 1970. Sunflower featured a strong group presence with significant writing contributions from all band members. Brian was active during this period, writing or co-writing seven of Sunflowers 12 songs and performing at half of the band's domestic concerts in 1970. The album received critical acclaim in both the US and the UK. This was offset by the album reaching only number 151 on US record charts during a four-week stay, becoming the worst-selling Beach Boys album at that point. Fans generally regard the LP as the Beach Boys' finest post-Pet Sounds album. In 2003, it placed at number 380 on Rolling Stones "Greatest Albums of All Time" list.

In mid-1970, the Beach Boys hired radio presenter Jack Rieley as their manager. One of his initiatives was to encourage the band to record songs featuring more socially conscious lyrics. He also requested the completion of "Surf's Up" and arranged a guest appearance at a Grateful Dead concert at Bill Graham's Fillmore East in April 1971 to foreground the Beach Boys' transition into the counterculture. During this time, the group ceased wearing matching uniforms on stage, and Dennis injured his hand, leaving him temporarily unable to play the drums. Dennis continued to make occasional appearances at concerts, singing or playing keyboards, and was replaced on drums by the Flame's Ricky Fataar. In July, the American music press rated the Beach Boys "the hottest grossing act" in the country, alongside Grand Funk Railroad. The band filmed a concert for ABC-TV in Central Park, which aired as Good Vibrations from Central Park on August 19.

On August 30, the band released Surf's Up, which was moderately successful, reaching the U.S. top 30, a marked improvement over their recent releases. While the record charted, the Beach Boys added to their renewed fame by performing a near-sellout set at Carnegie Hall; their live shows during this era included reworked arrangements of many of their previous songs, with their set lists culling from Pet Sounds and Smile. On October 28, the Beach Boys were the featured cover story on that date's issue of Rolling Stone. It included the first part of a lengthy two-part interview, titled "The Beach Boys: A California Saga", conducted by Tom Nolan and David Felton.

Fataar and Blondie Chaplin officially joined the band in early 1972, with Johnston departing shortly thereafter. The new line-up released the comparatively unsuccessful Carl and the Passions – "So Tough" in May 1972, followed by Holland in January 1973. Reprise felt Holland needed a strong single. Following the intervention of Van Dyke Parks, this resulted in the inclusion of "Sail On, Sailor". Reprise approved, and the resulting album peaked at number 37. Brian's musical children's story, Mount Vernon and Fairway, was included as a bonus EP.

Greatest hits LPs, touring resurgence, and Caribou sessions
After Holland, the group maintained a touring regimen, captured on the double live album The Beach Boys in Concert released in November 1973, but recorded very little in the studio through 1975. Several months earlier, they had announced that they would complete Smile, but this never came to fruition, and plans for its release were once again abandoned. Following Murry's death in June 1973, Brian retreated into his bedroom and withdrew further into drug abuse, alcoholism, chain smoking, and overeating. In October, the band fired Rieley. Rieley's position was succeeded by Mike Love's brother, Stephen, and Chicago manager James William Guercio. Chaplin and Fataar left the band in December 1973 and November 1974, respectively.

The Beach Boys' greatest hits compilation Endless Summer was released in June 1974 to unexpected success, becoming the band's second number-one U.S. album in October. The LP had a 155-week chart run, selling over 3 million copies. The Beach Boys became the number-one act in the U.S., propelling themselves from opening for Crosby, Stills, Nash and Young in the summer of 1974 to headliners selling out basketball arenas in a matter of weeks. Guercio prevailed upon the group to swap out newer songs with older material in their concert setlists, partly to accommodate their growing audience and the demand for their early hits. Later in the year, members of the band appeared as guests on Chicago's hit "Wishing You Were Here". At the end of 1974, Rolling Stone proclaimed the Beach Boys "Band of the Year" based on the strength of their live performances. To follow-up the success of Endless Summer, another greatest hits collection, Spirit of America, was released in April 1975 and also proved successful, reaching the U.S. top-ten.

To capitalize on their sudden resurgence in popularity, the Beach Boys accepted Guercio's invitation to record their next Reprise album at his Caribou Ranch studio, located around the mountains of Nederland, Colorado. These October 1974 sessions marked the group's return to the studio after a 21-month period of virtual inactivity, but the proceedings were cut short after Brian had insisted on returning to his home in Los Angeles. With the project put on hold, the Beach Boys spent most of the next year on the road playing college football stadiums and basketball arenas. The only Beach Boys recording of 1974 to see release at the time was the Christmas single "Child of Winter", recorded upon the group's return to Los Angeles in November and released the following month.

Over the summer of 1975, the touring group played a co-headlining series of concert dates with Chicago, a pairing that was nicknamed "Beachago". The tour was massively successful and restored the Beach Boys' profitability to what it had been in the mid-1960s. Although another joint tour with Chicago had been planned for the summer of 1976, the Beach Boys' association with Guercio and his Caribou Management company ended in early 1976. Stephen Love subsequently took over as the band's de facto business manager.

15 Big Ones, Love You, and Adult/Child

Early in 1975, Brian signed a production deal with California Music, a Los Angeles collective that included Bruce Johnston and Gary Usher, but was drawn away by the Beach Boys' pressing demands for a new album. In October, Marilyn persuaded Brian to admit himself to the care of psychologist Eugene Landy, who kept him from indulging in substance abuse with constant supervision. Brian was kept in the program until December 1976.

At the end of January 1976, the Beach Boys returned to the studio with Brian producing once again. Brian decided the band should do an album of rock and roll and doo wop standards. Carl and Dennis disagreed, feeling that an album of originals was far more ideal, while Love and Jardine wanted the album out as quickly as possible. To highlight Brian's recovery and his return to writing and producing, Stephen devised a promotional campaign with the tagline "Brian Is Back!", and paid the Rogers & Cowan publicity agency $3,500 per month to implement it. The band also commissioned an NBC-TV special, later known as The Beach Boys: It's OK!, that was produced by Saturday Night Live creator Lorne Michaels.

Released on July 5, 1976, 15 Big Ones was generally disliked by fans and critics, as well as Carl and Dennis, who disparaged the album to the press. The album peaked at number 8 in the U.S., becoming their first top 10 album of new material since Pet Sounds, and their highest-charting studio album since Summer Days (And Summer Nights!!). Lead single "Rock and Roll Music" peaked at number 5 – their highest chart ranking since "Good Vibrations".

From late 1976 to early 1977, Brian made sporadic public appearances and produced the band's next album, The Beach Boys Love You. He regarded it as a spiritual successor to Pet Sounds, namely because of the autobiographical lyrics. Released on April 11, 1977, Love You peaked at number 53 in the US and number 28 in the UK. Critically, it was met with polarized reactions from the public. Numerous esteemed critics penned favorable reviews, but casual listeners generally found the album's idiosyncratic sound to be a detriment.

Adult/Child, the intended follow-up to Love You, was completed, but the release was vetoed by Love and Jardine. According to Stan Love, when his brother Mike heard the album, Mike turned to Brian and asked: "What the fuck are you doing?" Some of the unreleased songs on Adult/Child later saw individual release on subsequent Beach Boys albums and compilations. Following this period, his concert appearances with the band gradually diminished and their performances were occasionally erratic.

CBS signing and M.I.U. Album
At the beginning of 1977, the Beach Boys had enjoyed their most lucrative concert tours ever, with the band playing in packed stadiums and earning up to $150,000 per show. Concurrently, the band was the subject of a record company bidding war, as their contract with Warner Bros. had been set to expire soon. Stephen Love arranged for the Beach Boys to sign an $8 million deal with CBS Records on March 1. Numerous stipulations were given in the CBS contract, including that Brian was required to write at least four songs per album, co-write at least 70% of all the tracks, and produce or co-produce alongside his brothers. Another part of the deal required the group to play thirty concerts a year in the U.S., in addition to one tour in Australia and Japan, and two tours in Europe.

Within weeks of the CBS contract, Stephen was effectively fired by the band, with one of the alleged reasons being that Mike had not permitted Stephen to sign on his behalf while at a TM retreat in Switzerland. For Stephen's replacement, the group hired Carl's friend Henry Lazarus, an entertainment business owner that had no prior experience in the music industry. Lazarus arranged a major European tour for the Beach Boys, starting in late July, with stops in Germany, Switzerland, and France. Due to poor planning, the tour was cancelled shortly before it began, as Lazarus had failed to complete the necessary paperwork. The group subsequently fired Lazarus and were sued by many of the concert promoters, with losses of $200,000 in preliminary expenses and $550,000 in potential revenue.

In July, the Beach Boys played a concert at Wembley Stadium that was notable for the fact that, during the show, Mike attacked Brian with a piano bench onstage in front of over 15,000 attendees. In August, Mike and Jardine persuaded Stephen to return as the group's manager, a decision that Carl and Dennis had strongly opposed.  By this point, the band had effectively split into two camps; Dennis and Carl on one side, Mike and Jardine on the other, with Brian remaining neutral. These two opposing contingents within the group – known among their associates as the "free-livers" and the "meditators" – were traveling in different planes, using different hotels, and rarely speaking to each other. According to Love, "[T]he terms 'smokers' and 'nonsmokers' were also used."

On September 3, after completing the final date of a northeastern U.S. tour, the internal wrangling came to a head. Following a confrontation on an airport tarmac – a spectacle that a bystanding Rolling Stone journalist compared to the ending of Casablanca – Dennis declared that he had left the band. The group was broken up until a meeting at Brian's house on September 17. In light of the lucrative CBS contract, the parties negotiated a settlement resulting in Love gaining control of Brian's vote in the group, allowing Love and Jardine to outvote Carl and Dennis on any matter.

The group had still owed one more album for Reprise. Released in September 1978, M.I.U. Album was recorded at Maharishi International University in Iowa at the suggestion of Love. Dennis and Carl made limited contributions; the album was produced by Jardine and Ron Altbach, with Brian credited as "executive producer". Dennis started to withdraw from the group to focus on his second solo album, Bambu, which was shelved just as alcoholism and marital problems overcame all three Wilson brothers. Carl appeared intoxicated during concerts (especially at appearances for their 1978 Australia tour) and Brian gradually slid back into addiction and an unhealthy lifestyle. Stephen was fired shortly after the Australia tour partly due to an incident in which Brian's bodyguard Rocky Pamplin physically assaulted Carl.

1978–1998: Continued recording and Brian's estrangement

L.A. (Light Album) and Keepin' the Summer Alive

The group's first two albums for CBS, 1979's L.A. (Light Album) and 1980's Keepin' the Summer Alive, struggled in the U.S., charting at 100 and 75 respectively. The recording of these albums saw Bruce Johnston return to the band as a full-time member. In between the two albums the group contributed the song "It's a Beautiful Day" to the soundtrack of the film Americathon.  In an April 1980 interview, Carl reflected that "the last two years have been the most important and difficult time of our career. We were at the ultimate crossroads. We had to decide whether what we had been involved in since we were teenagers had lost its meaning. We asked ourselves and each other the difficult questions we'd often avoided in the past." By the next year, he left the touring group because of unhappiness with the band's nostalgia format and lackluster live performances, subsequently pursuing a solo career. He stated: "I haven't quit the Beach Boys but I do not plan on touring with them until they decide that 1981 means as much to them as 1961." Carl returned in May 1982, after approximately 14 months of being away, on the condition that the group reconsider their rehearsal and touring policies and refrain from "Las Vegas-type" engagements.

On June 21, 1980, the Beach Boys performed a concert at Knebworth, England, which featured a slightly intoxicated Dennis. The concert would later be released as a live album titled Good Timin': Live at Knebworth England 1980 in 2002.

In late 1982, Eugene Landy was once more employed as Brian's therapist, and a more radical program was undertaken to try to restore Brian to health. This involved removing him from the group on November 5, 1982, at the behest of Carl, Love, and Jardine, in addition to putting him on a rigorous diet and health regimen.

Death of Dennis, The Beach Boys, and Still Cruisin

By the late 70s and early 80s, Dennis had been embroiled in successive failed romantic relationships, including a tense and short-lived relationship with Fleetwood Mac's Christine McVie, and found himself in severe economic trouble resulting in the sale of Brother Studios, established by the Wilson brothers in 1974 and where Pacific Ocean Blue was produced, and the forfeiture of his beloved yacht. To cope with the combination of devastating losses, Dennis heavily abused alcohol, cocaine, and heroin and was, by 1983, homeless and lived a nomadic lifestyle. He was often seen spending much of his time wandering the Los Angeles coast and often missed Beach Boys performances. By this point, he had lost his voice and much of his ability to play drums.

In 1983, tensions between Dennis and Love escalated to the point that each obtained a restraining order against the other. Following Brian's readmission for Landy's treatment, Dennis was given an ultimatum after his last performance in November 1983 to check into rehab for his alcohol problems or be banned from performing live with the band again. Dennis checked into rehab for his chance to get sober, but on December 28, he drowned at the age of 39 in Marina del Rey while diving from a friend's boat trying to recover items that he had previously thrown overboard in a fit of rage.

The Beach Boys spent the next several years touring, often playing in front of large audiences, and recording songs for film soundtracks and various artists compilations. One new studio album, the self-titled The Beach Boys, appeared in 1985 and proved a modest success, becoming their highest charting album in the U.S. since 15 Big Ones. The Beach Boys was the group's final album for CBS. The following year they returned to Capitol with a new greatest hits album, Made in U.S.A, which featured two new tracks and eventually went double platinum. Commenting on his relationship to the band in 1988, Brian said that he avoided his family at Landy's suggestion, adding that "Although we stay together as a group, as people we're a far cry from friends." Mike denied the accusation that he and the band were keeping Brian from participating with the group. In 1988, they unexpectedly claimed their first U.S. number one single in 22 years with "Kokomo", which topped the chart for one week. It appeared in the film Cocktail and on the album Still Cruisin', which went platinum in the U.S.

Lawsuits, Summer in Paradise, and Stars and Stripes, Vol. 1

Carlin summarized, "Once surfin' pin-ups, they remade themselves as avant-garde pop artists, then psychedelic oracles. After that they were down-home hippies, then retro-hip icons. Eventually they devolved into none of the above: a kind of perpetual-motion nostalgia machine." Music journalist Erik Davis wrote in 1990, "the Beach Boys are either dead, deranged, or dinosaurs; their records are Eurocentric, square, unsampled; they've made too much money to merit hip revisionism." In 1992, critic Jim Miller wrote, "They have become a figment of their own past, prisoners of their unflagging popularity—incongruous emblems of a sunny myth of eternal youth belied by much of their own best music. … The group is still largely identified with its hits from the early Sixties."

Love filed a defamation lawsuit against Brian due to how he was presented in Brian's 1992 memoir Wouldn't It Be Nice: My Own Story. Its publisher HarperCollins settled the suit for $1.5 million. He said that the suit allowed his lawyer "to gain access to the transcripts of Brian's interviews with his [book] collaborator, Todd Gold. Those interviews affirmed—according to Brian—that I had been the inspiration of the group and that I had written many of the songs that [would soon be] in dispute." Other defamation lawsuits were filed by Carl, Brother Records, and the Wilsons' mother Audree. With Love and Brian unable to determine exactly what Love was properly owed in royalties, Love sued Brian in 1992, winning $13 million in 1994 for lost royalties. 35 of the group's songs were then amended to credit Love. He later called it "almost certainly the largest case of fraud in music history".

The day after California courts issued a restraining order between Brian and Landy, Brian phoned Sire Records staff producer Andy Paley to collaborate on new material tentatively for the Beach Boys. After losing the songwriting credits lawsuit with Love, Brian told MOJO in February 1995: "Mike and I are just cool. There's a lot of shit Andy and I got written for him. I just had to get through that goddamn trial!" In April, it was unclear whether the project would turn into a Wilson solo album, a Beach Boys album, or a combination of the two. The project ultimately disintegrated. Instead, Brian and his bandmates recorded Stars and Stripes Vol. 1, an album of country music stars covering Beach Boys songs, with co-production helmed by River North Records owner Joe Thomas. Afterward, the group discussed finishing the album Smile, but Carl rejected the idea, fearing that it would cause Brian another nervous breakdown.

 1998–present: Love-led tours
 Death of Carl and band name litigation 

Early in 1997, Carl was diagnosed with lung and brain cancer after years of heavy smoking. Despite his terminal condition, Carl continued to perform with the band on its 1997 summer tour (a double-bill with the band Chicago) while undergoing chemotherapy. During performances, he sat on a stool and needed oxygen after every song. Carl died on February 6, 1998, at the age of 51, two months after the death of the Wilsons' mother, Audree.

After Carl's death, Jardine left the touring line-up and began to perform regularly with his band  "Beach Boys: Family & Friends" until he ran into legal issues for using the name without license. Meanwhile, Jardine sued Love, claiming that he had been excluded from their concerts, BRI, through its longtime attorney, Ed McPherson, sued Jardine in Federal Court. Jardine, in turn, counter-claimed against BRI for wrongful termination. BRI ultimately prevailed.

In 2000, ABC-TV premiered a two-part television miniseries, The Beach Boys: An American Family, that dramatized the Beach Boys' story. It was produced by John Stamos, and was criticized by numerous parties, including Wilson, for historical inaccuracies.

In 2004, Wilson recorded and released his solo album Brian Wilson Presents Smile, a reinterpretation of the unfinished Smile project. That September, Wilson issued a free CD through the Mail On Sunday that included Beach Boys songs he had recently rerecorded, five of which he co-authored with Love. The 10 track compilation had 2.6 million copies distributed and prompted Love to file a lawsuit in November 2005; he claimed the promotion hurt the sales of the original recordings. Love's suit was dismissed in 2007 when a judge determined that there were no triable issues.

That's Why God Made the Radio and brief reunion tour 
On October 31, 2011, Capitol released a compilation and box set dedicated to Smile in the form of The Smile Sessions. The album garnered universal critical acclaim and charted in both the US Billboard and UK top 30. It went on to win Best Historical Album at the 2013 Grammy Awards.

On December 16, 2011, it was announced that Wilson, Love, Jardine, Johnston and David Marks would reunite for a new album and 50th anniversary tour. On February 12, 2012, the Beach Boys performed at the 2012 Grammy Awards, in what was billed as a "special performance" by organizers. It marked the group's first live performance to include Wilson since 1996, Jardine since 1998, and Marks since 1999. Released on June 5, That's Why God Made the Radio debuted at number 3 on the U.S. charts, expanding the group's span of Billboard 200 top-ten albums across 49 years and one week, passing the Beatles with 47 years of top-ten albums. Critics generally regarded the album as an "uneven" collection, with most of the praise centered on its closing musical suite.

The reunion tour ended in September 2012 as planned, but amid erroneous rumors that Love had dismissed Wilson from the Beach Boys. Love and Johnston continued to perform under the Beach Boys name, while Wilson, Jardine, and Marks continued to tour as a trio, and a subsequent tour with guitarist Jeff Beck also included Blondie Chaplin at select dates.

Copyright extension releases
Responding to a new European Union copyright law that extended copyright to 70 years for recordings that were published within 50 years after they were made, Capitol began issuing annual 50-year anniversary "copyright extension" releases of Beach Boys recordings, starting with The Big Beat 1963 (2013).

Jardine, Marks, Johnston and Love appeared together at the 2014 Ella Awards Ceremony, where Love was honored for his work as a singer. In 2015, Soundstage aired an episode featuring Wilson performing with Jardine, Chaplin, and Fataar at The Venetian in Las Vegas. In April, when asked if he was interested in making music with Love again, Wilson replied: "I don't think so, no," adding in July that he "doesn't talk to the Beach Boys [or] Mike Love."

In 2016, Love and Wilson published memoirs, Good Vibrations: My Life as a Beach Boy and I Am Brian Wilson, respectively. Asked about negative comments that Wilson made about him in the book, Love challenged the legitimacy of statements attributed to Wilson in the book and in the press. In an interview with Rolling Stone conducted in June 2016, Wilson said he would like to try to repair his relationship with Love and collaborate with him again. In January 2017, Love said, "If it were possible to make it just Brian and I, and have it under control and done better than what happened in 2012, then yeah, I'd be open to something."

In July 2018, Wilson, Jardine, Love, Johnston, and Marks reunited for a one-off Q&A session moderated by director Rob Reiner at the Capitol Records Tower in Los Angeles. It was the first time the band had appeared together in public since their 2012 tour. That December, Love described his new holiday album, Reason for the Season, as a "message to Brian" and said that he "would love nothing more than to get together with Brian and do some music."

In February 2020, Wilson and Jardine's official social media pages encouraged fans to boycott the band's music after it was announced that Love's Beach Boys would  perform at the Safari Club International Convention in Reno, Nevada on animal rights grounds. The concert proceeded despite online protests, as Love issued a statement that said his group has always supported "freedom of thought and expression as a fundamental tenet of our rights as Americans."  In October, Love and Johnston's Beach Boys performed at a fundraiser for Donald Trump's presidential re-election campaign; Wilson and Jardine again issued a statement that they had not been informed about this performance and did not support it.

Selling of the band's intellectual property and 60th anniversary
In March 2020, Jardine was asked about a possible reunion and responded that the band would reunite for a string of live performances in 2021, although he believed a new album was unlikely. In response to reunion rumors, Love said in May that he was open to a 60th anniversary tour, although Wilson has "some serious health issues", while Wilson's manager Jean Sievers commented that no one had spoken to Wilson about such a tour. In February 2021, it was announced that Brian Wilson, Love, Jardine, and the estate of Carl Wilson had sold a majority stake in the band's intellectual property to Irving Azoff and his new company Iconic Artists Group; rumors of a 60th anniversary reunion were again discussed.

In April 2021, Omnivore Recordings released California Music Presents Add Some Music, an album featuring Love, Jardine, Marks, Johnston, and several children of the original Beach Boys. In August, Capitol released the box set Feel Flows: The Sunflower & Surf's Up Sessions 1969–1971. In 2022, the group was expected to participate in a "60th anniversary celebration". Azoff stated in an interview from May 2021, "We're going to announce a major deal with a streamer for the definitive documentary on The Beach Boys and a 60th anniversary celebration. We’re planning a tribute concert affiliated with the Rock & Roll Hall of Fame and SiriusXM, with amazing acts. That’s adding value, and that’s why I invested in The Beach Boys."

On Mike Love's 81st birthday, Al Jardine once again hinted at a possible reunion on his Facebook page by stating that he was "looking forward" to seeing Love at the "reunion".  However, while a reunion ultimately did not occur in 2022, Capitol released Sail On Sailor – 1972 towards the end of the year.

In January 2023, the tribute concert mentioned by Azoff in 2021 was announced as being part of the “Grammys Salute” series of televised tribute concerts. It will occur two days after the 2023 Grammys and air later in 2023; no contributing artists, nor any potential participation from the band members themselves, have (currently) been officially announced.

Musical style and development

In Understanding Rock: Essays in Musical Analysis, musicologist Daniel Harrison writes:

The Beach Boys began as a garage band playing 1950s style rock and roll, reassembling styles of music such as surf to include vocal jazz harmony, which created their unique sound. In addition, they introduced their signature approach to common genres such as the pop ballad by applying harmonic or formal twists not native to rock and roll. Among the distinct elements of the Beach Boys' style were the nasal quality of their singing voices, their use of a falsetto harmony over a driving, locomotive-like melody, and the sudden chiming in of the whole group on a key line. Brian Wilson handled most stages of the group's recording process from the beginning, even though he was not properly credited on most of the early recordings.

Early on, Mike Love sang lead vocals in the rock-oriented songs, while Carl contributed guitar lines on the group's ballads. Jim Miller commented: "On straight rockers they sang tight harmonies behind Love's lead ... on ballads, Brian played his falsetto off against lush, jazz-tinged voicings, often using (for rock) unorthodox harmonic structures." Harrison adds that "even the least distinguished of the Beach Boys' early uptempo rock 'n' roll songs show traces of structural complexity at some level; Brian was simply too curious and experimental to leave convention alone." Although Brian was often dubbed a perfectionist, he was an inexperienced musician, and his understanding of music was mostly self-taught. At the lyric stage, he usually worked with Love, whose assertive persona provided youthful swagger that contrasted Brian's explorations in romanticism and sensitivity. Luis Sanchez noted a pattern where Brian would spare surfing imagery when working with collaborators outside of his band's circle, in the examples "Lonely Sea" and "In My Room".

Brian's bandmates resented the notion that he was the sole creative force in the group. In a 1966 article that asked if "the Beach Boys rely too much on sound genius Brian", Carl said that although Brian was the most responsible for their music, every member of the group contributed ideas. Mike Love wrote, "As far as I was concerned, Brian was a genius, deserving of that recognition. But the rest of us were seen as nameless components in Brian's music machine ... It didn't feel to us as if we were just riding on Brian's coattails." Conversely, Dennis defended Brian's stature in the band, stating: "Brian Wilson is the Beach Boys. He is the band. We're his fucking messengers. He is all of it. Period. We're nothing. He's everything."

Influences

The band's earliest influences came primarily from the work of Chuck Berry and the Four Freshmen. Performed by the Four Freshmen, "Their Hearts Were Full of Spring" (1961) was a particular favorite of the group. By analyzing their arrangements of pop standards, Brian educated himself on jazz harmony. Bearing this in mind, Philip Lambert noted, "If Bob Flanigan helped teach Brian how to sing, then Gershwin, Kern, Porter, and the other members of this pantheon helped him learn how to craft a song." Other general influences on the group included the Hi-Los, the Penguins, the Robins, Bill Haley & His Comets, Otis Williams, the Cadets, the Everly Brothers, the Shirelles, the Regents, and the Crystals.

The eclectic mix of white and black vocal group influences – ranging from the rock and roll of Berry, the jazz harmonies of the Four Freshmen, the pop of the Four Preps, the folk of the Kingston Trio, the R&B of groups like the Coasters and the Five Satins, and the doo wop of Dion and the Belmonts – helped contribute to the Beach Boys' uniqueness in American popular music. Carl remembered: "Most of [Mike's] classmates were black. He was the only white guy on his track team. He was really immersed in doo-wop and that music and I think he influenced Brian to listen to it. The black artists were so much better in terms of rock records in those days that the white records almost sounded like put-ons." On Jimi Hendrix and "heavy" music, Brian said he felt no pressure to go in that direction: "We never got into the heavy musical level trip. We never needed to. It's already been done."

Another significant influence on Brian's work was Burt Bacharach. He said in the 1960s: "Burt Bacharach and Hal David are more like me. They're also the best pop team – per se – today. As a producer, Bacharach has a very fresh, new approach." Regarding surf rock pioneer Dick Dale, Brian said that his influence on the group was limited to Carl and his style of guitar playing. Carl credited Chuck Berry, the Ventures, and John Walker with shaping his guitar style, and that the Beach Boys had learned to play all of the Ventures' songs by ear early in their career.

In 1967, Lou Reed wrote in Aspen that the Beach Boys created a "hybrid sound" out of old rock and the Four Freshmen, explaining that such songs as "Let Him Run Wild", "Don't Worry Baby", "I Get Around", and "Fun, Fun, Fun" were not unlike "Peppermint Stick" by the Elchords. Similarly, John Sebastian of the Lovin' Spoonful noted, "Brian had control of this vocal palette of which we had no idea. We had never paid attention to the Four Freshmen or doo-wop combos like the Crew Cuts. Look what gold he mined out of that."

Vocals
Brian identified each member individually for their vocal range, once detailing the ranges for Carl, Dennis, Jardine ("[they] progress upwards through G, A, and B"), Love ("can go from bass to the E above middle C"), and himself ("I can take the second D in the treble clef"). He declared in 1966 that his greatest interest was to expand modern vocal harmony, owing to his fascination with a voice to the Four Freshmen, which he considered a "groovy sectional sound." He added, "The harmonies that we are able to produce give us a uniqueness which is really the only important thing you can put into records – some quality that no one else has got. I love peaks in a song – and enhancing them on the control panel. Most of all, I love the human voice for its own sake." For a period, Brian avoided singing falsetto for the group, saying, "I thought people thought I was a fairy...the band told me, 'If that's the way you sing, don't worry about it.'"

From lowest intervals to highest, the group's vocal harmony stack usually began with Love or Dennis, followed by Jardine or Carl, and finally Brian on top, according to Jardine, while Carl said that the blend was Love on bottom, Carl above, followed by Dennis or Jardine, and then Brian on top. Jardine explains, "We always sang the same vocal intervals. ... As soon as we heard the chords on the piano we'd figure it out pretty easily. If there was a vocal move [Brian] envisioned, he'd show that particular singer that move. We had somewhat photographic memory as far as the vocal parts were concerned so that [was] never a problem for us." Striving for perfection, Brian insured that his intricate vocal arrangements exercised the group's calculated blend of intonation, attack, phrasing, and expression. Sometimes, he would sing each vocal harmony part alone through multi-track tape.

On the group's blend, Carl said: "[Love] has a beautifully rich, very full-sounding bass voice. Yet his lead singing is real nasal, real punk. [Jardine]'s voice has a bright timbre to it; it really cuts. My voice has a kind of calm sound. We're big oooh-ers; we love to oooh. It's a big, full sound, that's very pleasing to us; it opens up the heart." Rock critic Erik Davis wrote, "The 'purity' of tone and genetic proximity that smoothed their voices was almost creepy, pseudo-castrato, [and] a 'barbershop' sound." Jimmy Webb said, "They used very little vibrato and sing in very straight tones. The voices all lie down beside each other very easily – there's no bumping between them because the pitch is very precise." According to Brian: "Jack Good once told us, 'You sing like eunuchs in a Sistine Chapel,' which was a pretty good quote." Writer Richard Goldstein reported that, according to a fellow journalist who asked Brian about the black roots of his music, Brian's response was: "We're white and we sing white." Goldstein added that when he asked where his approach to vocal harmonies had derived from, Wilson answered: 'Barbershop'."

Use of studio musicians

Biographer James Murphy said, "By most contemporary accounts, they were not a very good live band when they started. ... The Beach Boys learned to play as a band in front of live audiences", eventually to become "one of the best and enduring live bands". With only a few exceptions, the Beach Boys played every instrument heard on their first four albums and first five singles. It is the belief of Richie Unterberger that, "Before session musicians took over most of the parts, the Beach Boys could play respectably gutsy surf rock as a self-contained unit."

As Wilson's arrangements increased in complexity, he began employing a group of professional studio musicians, later known as "the Wrecking Crew", to assist with recording the instrumentation on select tracks. According to some reports, these musicians then completely replaced the Beach Boys on the backing tracks to their records. Much of the relevant documentation, while accounting for the attendance of unionized session players, had failed to record the presence of the Beach Boys themselves. These documents, along with the full unedited studio session tapes, were not available for public scrutiny until the 1990s.

Wilson started occasionally employing members of the Wrecking Crew for certain Beach Boys tracks during the 1963 Surfer Girl sessions – specifically, on two songs, "Hawaii" and "Our Car Club". The 1964 albums Shut Down Volume 2 and All Summer Long featured the Beach Boys themselves playing the vast majority of the instruments while occasionally being augmented by outside musicians. It is commonly misreported that Dennis in particular was replaced by Hal Blaine on drums. Dennis's drumming is documented on a number of the group's singles, including 1964's "I Get Around", "Fun, Fun, Fun", and "Don't Worry Baby". Starting with the 1965 albums Today! and Summer Days, Brian used the Wrecking Crew with greater frequency, "but still", Stebbins writes, "the Beach Boys continued to play the instruments on many of the key tracks and single releases."

Overall, the Beach Boys played the instruments on the majority of their recordings from the decade, with 1966 and 1967 being the only years when Wilson used the Wrecking Crew almost exclusively. Pet Sounds and Smile are their only albums in which the backing tracks were largely played by studio musicians. After 1967, the band's use of studio musicians was considerably reduced. Wrecking Crew biographer Kent Hartman supported in his 2012 book about the musicians, "Though [Brian Wilson] had for several months brought in various session players on a sporadic, potluck basis to supplement things, the other Beach Boys generally played on the earliest songs, too."

The source of the longstanding controversy regarding the Beach Boys' use of studio musicians largely derives from a misinterpreted statement in David Leaf's 1978 biography The Beach Boys and the California Myth, later bolstered by erroneous recollections from participants of the recording sessions. Starting in the 1990s, unedited studio session tapes, along with American Federation of Musicians (AFM) sheets and tape logs, were leaked to the public. Music historian Craig Slowinski, who contributes musician credits to the liner notes of the band's reissues and compilations, wrote in 2006: "[O]nce the vaults were opened up and the tapes were studied, the true situation became clear: the Boys themselves played most of the instruments on their records until the Beach Boys Today! album in early 1965." Slowinski goes on to note, "when painting a picture of a Beach Boys recording session, it’s important to examine both the AFM contracts and the session tapes, either of which may be incomplete on their own."

During the period when Brian relied heavily on studio musicians, Carl was an exception among the Beach Boys in that he played alongside the studio musicians whenever he was available to attend sessions. In Slowinski's view, "One should not sell short Carl's own contributions; the youngest Wilson had developed as a musician sufficiently to play alongside the horde of high-dollar session pros that big brother was now bringing into the studio. Carl's guitar playing [was] a key ingredient."

Spirituality
The band members often reflected on the spiritual nature of their music (and music in general), particularly for the recording of Pet Sounds and Smile. Even though the Wilsons did not grow up in a particularly religious household, Carl was described as "the most truly religious person I know" by Brian, and Carl was forthcoming about the group's spiritual beliefs stating: "We believe in God as a kind of universal consciousness. God is love. God is you. God is me. God is everything right here in this room. It's a spiritual concept which inspires a great deal of our music." Carl told Rave magazine in 1967 that the group's influences are of a "religious nature", but not any religion in specific, only "an idea based upon that of Universal Consciousness. ... The spiritual concept of happiness and doing good to others is extremely important to the lyric of our songs, and the religious element of some of the better church music is also contained within some of our new work."

Brian is quoted during the Smile era: "I'm very religious. Not in the sense of churches, going to church; but like the essence of all religion." During the recording of Pet Sounds, Brian held prayer meetings, later reflecting that "God was with us the whole time we were doing this record ... I could feel that feeling in my brain." In 1966, he explained that he wanted to move into a white spiritual sound, and predicted that the rest of the music industry would follow suit. In 2011, Brian maintained the spirituality was important to his music, and that he did not follow any particular religion.

Carl said that Smile was chosen as an album title because of its connection to the group's spiritual beliefs. Brian referred to Smile as his "teenage symphony to God", composing a hymn, "Our Prayer", as the album's opening spiritual invocation. Experimentation with psychotropic substances also proved pivotal to the group's development as artists. He spoke of his LSD trips as a "religious experience", and during a session for "Our Prayer", Brian can be heard asking the other Beach Boys: "Do you guys feel any acid yet?". In 1968, the group's interest in transcendental meditation led them to record the original song, "Transcendental Meditation".

Legacy and cultural influence
Achievements and accolades
The Beach Boys are one of the most critically acclaimed, commercially successful, and influential bands of all time. They have sold over 100 million records worldwide. The group's early songs made them major pop stars in the US, the UK, Australia and other countries, having seven top 10 singles between April 1963 and November 1964. They were one of the first American groups to exhibit the definitive traits of a self-contained rock band, playing their own instruments and writing their own songs, and they were one of the few American bands formed prior to the 1964 British Invasion to continue their success. Among artists of the 1960s, they are one of the central figures in the histories of rock. Between the 1960s and 2020s, they had 37 songs reach the US Top 40 (the most by an American group) with four topping the Billboard Hot 100; they also hold Nielsen SoundScan's record as the top-selling American band for albums and singles.

Brian Wilson's artistic control over the Beach Boys' records was unprecedented for the time. Carl Wilson elaborated: "Record companies were used to having absolute control over their artists. It was especially nervy, because Brian was a 21-year-old kid with just two albums. It was unheard of. But what could they say? Brian made good records." This made the Beach Boys one of the first rock groups to exert studio control. Music producers after the mid-1960s would draw on Brian's influence, setting a precedent that allowed bands and artists to enter a recording studio and act as producers, either autonomously, or in conjunction with other like minds.

The band routinely appears in the upper reaches of ranked lists such as "The Top 1000 Albums of All Time." Many of the group's songs and albums, including The Beach Boys Today!, Smiley Smile, Sunflower, and Surf's Up—and especially Pet Sounds and "Good Vibrations"—are featured in numerous lists devoted to the greatest albums or singles of all time. The latter two frequently appear on the number one spot. On Acclaimed Music, which aggregates the rankings of decades of critics' lists, Pet Sounds is ranked as the greatest album of all time, while "Good Vibrations" is the third-greatest song of all time ("God Only Knows" is also ranked 21). The group itself is ranked number 11 in its 1000 most recommended artists of all time. In 2004, Rolling Stone ranked the band number 12 on the magazine's list of the "100 Greatest Artists of All Time".

In 1988, the core quintet of the Wilson brothers, Love, and Jardine were inducted into the Rock and Roll Hall of Fame. Ten years later, they were selected for the Vocal Group Hall of Fame. In 2004, Pet Sounds was preserved in the National Recording Registry by the Library of Congress for being "culturally, historically, and aesthetically significant." Their recordings of "In My Room", "Good Vibrations", "California Girls" and the entire Pet Sounds album have been inducted into the Grammy Hall of Fame.

The Beach Boys are one of the most influential acts of the rock era. In 2017, a study of AllMusic's catalog indicated the Beach Boys as the 6th most frequently cited artist influence in its database. For the 50th anniversary of Pet Sounds, 26 artists contributed to a Pitchfork retrospective on its influence, which included comments from members of Talking Heads, Yo La Tengo, Chairlift, and Deftones. The editor noted that the "wide swath of artists assembled for this feature represent but a modicum of the album's vast measure of influence. Its scope transcends just about all lines of age, race, and gender. Its impact continues to broaden with each passing generation." In 2021, the staff of Ultimate Classic Rock ranked the Beach Boys as the top American band of all time; the publication's editor wrote in the group's entry that "few bands ... have had a greater impact on popular music."

In 2023, a study by music psychologist Michael Bonshor suggested that two of their songs were among the happiest songs ever recorded: "Good Vibrations" and "Wouldn't It Be Nice". The study used a formula based on tempo, key, lyrics and musical features to rank 126 songs from a period of 50 years.

California sound

Professor of cultural studies James M. Curtis wrote in 1987, "We can say that the Beach Boys represent the outlook and values of white Protestant Anglo-Saxon teenagers in the early sixties. Having said that, we immediately realize that they must mean much more than this. Their stability, their staying power, and their ability to attract new fans prove as much." Cultural historian Kevin Starr explains that the group first connected with young Americans specifically for their lyrical interpretation of a mythologized landscape: "Cars and the beach, surfing, the California Girl, all this fused in the alembic of youth: Here was a way of life, an iconography, already half-released into the chords and multiple tracks of a new sound." in Robert Christgau's opinion, "the Beach Boys were a touchstone for real rock and rollers, all of whom understood that the music had its most essential roots in an innocently hedonistic materialism."

The group's "California sound" grew to national prominence through the success of their 1963 album Surfin' U.S.A., which helped turn the surfing subculture into a mainstream youth-targeted advertising image widely exploited by the film, television, and food industry. The group's surf music was not entirely of their own invention, being preceded by artists such as Dick Dale. However, previous surf musicians did not project a world view as the Beach Boys did. The band's earlier surf music helped raise the profile of the state of California, creating its first major regional style with national significance, and establishing a musical identity for Southern California, as opposed to Hollywood. California ultimately supplanted New York as the center of popular music thanks to the success of Brian's productions.

A 1966 article discussing new trends in rock music writes that the Beach Boys popularized a type of drum beat heard in Jan and Dean's "Surf City", which sounds like "a locomotive getting up speed", in addition to the method of "suddenly stopping in between the chorus and verse". Pete Townshend of the Who is credited with coining the term "power pop", which he defined as "what we play—what the Small Faces used to play, and the kind of pop the Beach Boys played in the days of 'Fun, Fun, Fun' which I preferred."

The California sound gradually evolved to reflect a more musically ambitious and mature world view, becoming less to do with surfing and cars and more about social consciousness and political awareness. Between 1964 and 1969, it fueled innovation and transition, inspiring artists to tackle largely unmentioned themes such as sexual freedom, black pride, drugs, oppositional politics, other countercultural motifs, and war. Soft pop (later known as "sunshine pop") derived in part from this movement. Sunshine pop producers widely imitated the orchestral style of Pet Sounds; however, the Beach Boys themselves were rarely representative of the genre, which was rooted in easy-listening and advertising jingles.

By the end of the 1960s, the California sound declined due to a combination of the West Coast's cultural shifts, Wilson's professional and psychological downturn, and the Manson murders, with David Howard calling it the "sunset of the original California Sunshine Sound ... [the] sweetness advocated by the California Myth had led to chilling darkness and unsightly rot". Drawing from the Beach Boys' associations with Charles Manson and former California governor Ronald Reagan, Erik Davis remarked, "The Beach Boys may be the only bridge between those deranged poles. There is a wider range of political and aesthetic sentiments in their records than in any other band in those heady times—like the state [of California], they expand and bloat and contradict themselves."

During the 1970s, advertising jingles and imagery were predominately based on the Beach Boys' early music and image. The group also inspired the development of the West Coast style later dubbed "yacht rock". According to Jacobins Dan O'Sullivan, the band's aesthetic was the first to be "scavenged" by yacht rock acts like Rupert Holmes. O'Sullivan also cites the Beach Boys' recording of "Sloop John B" as the origin of yacht rock's preoccupation with the "sailors and beachgoers" aesthetic that was "lifted by everyone, from Christopher Cross to Eric Carmen, from 'Buffalo Springfield' folksters like Jim Messina to 'Philly Sound' rockers like Hall & Oates."

Innovations

Pet Sounds came to inform the developments of genres such as pop, rock, jazz, electronic, experimental, punk, and hip hop. Similar to subsequent experimental rock LPs by Frank Zappa, the Beatles, and the Who, Pet Sounds featured countertextural aspects that called attention to the very recordedness of the album. Professor of American history John Robert Greene stated that the album broke new ground and took rock music away from its casual lyrics and melodic structures into what was then uncharted territory. He furthermore called it one factor which spawned the majority of trends in post-1965 rock music, the only others being Rubber Soul, the Beatles' Revolver, and the contemporary folk movement. The album was the first piece in popular music to incorporate the Electro-Theremin, an easier-to-play version of the theremin, as well as the first in rock music to feature a theremin-like instrument. With Pet Sounds, they were also the first group to make an entire album that departed from the usual small-ensemble electric rock band format.

According to David Leaf in 1978, Pet Sounds and "Good Vibrations" "established the group as the leaders of a new type of pop music, Art Rock." Academic Bill Martin states that the band opened a path in rock music "that went from Sgt. Pepper's to Close to the Edge and beyond". He argues that the advancing technology of multitrack recording and mixing boards were more influential to experimental rock than electronic instruments such as the synthesizer, allowing the Beatles and the Beach Boys to become the first crop of non-classically trained musicians to create extended and complex compositions. In Strange Sounds: Offbeat Instruments and Sonic Experiments in Pop, Mark Brend writes:

The making of "Good Vibrations", according to Domenic Priore, was "unlike anything previous in the realms of classical, jazz, international, soundtrack, or any other kind of recording", while biographer Peter Ames Carlin wrote that it "sounded like nothing that had ever been played on the radio before." It contained previously untried mixes of instruments, and was the first successful pop song to have cellos in a juddering rhythm. Musicologist Charlie Gillett called it "one of the first records to flaunt studio production as a quality in its own right, rather than as a means of presenting a performance". Again, Brian employed the use of Electro-Theremin for the track. Upon release, the single prompted an unexpected revival in theremins while increasing awareness of analog synthesizers, leading Moog Music to produce their own brand of ribbon-controlled instruments. In a 1968 editorial for Jazz & Pop, Gene Sculatti predicted that the song "may yet prove to be the most significantly revolutionary piece of the current rock renaissance ... In no minor way, 'Good Vibrations' is a primary influential piece for all producing rock artists; everyone has felt its import to some degree".

Discussing Smiley Smile, Daniel Harrison argues that the album could "almost" be considered art music in the Western classical tradition, and that the group's innovations in the musical language of rock can be compared to those that introduced atonal and other nontraditional techniques into that classical tradition. He explains, "The spirit of experimentation is just as palpable ... as it is in, say, Schoenberg's op. 11 piano pieces." However, such notions were not widely acknowledged by rock audiences nor by the classically minded at the time. Harrison concludes: "What influences could these innovations then have? The short answer is, not much. Smiley Smile, Wild Honey, Friends, and 20/20 sound like few other rock albums; they are sui generis. ... It must be remembered that the commercial failure of the Beach Boys' experiments was hardly motivation for imitation." Musicologist David Toop, who included the Smiley Smile track "Fall Breaks and Back to Winter" on a companion CD for his book Ocean of Sound, placed the Beach Boys' effect on sound pioneering in league with Les Baxter, Aphex Twin, Herbie Hancock, King Tubby, and My Bloody Valentine.

Sunflower marked an end to the experimental songwriting and production phase initiated by Smiley Smile. After Surf's Up, Harrison wrote, their albums "contain a mixture of middle-of-the-road music entirely consonant with pop style during the early 1970s with a few oddities that proved that the desire to push beyond conventional boundaries was not dead," until 1974, "the year in which the Beach Boys ceased to be a rock 'n' roll act and became an oldies act."

Punk, alternative, and indie

In the 1970s, the Beach Boys served a "totemic influence" on punk rock that later gave way to indie rock. Brad Shoup of Stereogum surmised that, thanks to the Ramones' praise for the group, many punk, pop punk, or "punk-adjacent" artists showed influence from the Beach Boys, noting cover versions of the band's songs recorded by Slickee Boys, Agent Orange, Bad Religion, Shonen Knife, the Queers, Hi-Standard, the Descendents, the Donnas, M.O.D., and the Vandals. The Beach Boys Love You is sometimes considered the group's "punk album", and Pet Sounds is sometimes advanced as the first emo album.

In the 1990s, the Beach Boys experienced a resurgence of popularity with the alternative rock generation. According to Sean O'Hagan, leader of the High Llamas and former member of Stereolab, a younger generation of record-buyers "stopped listening to indie records" in favor of the Beach Boys. Bands who advocated for the Beach Boys included founding members of the Elephant 6 Collective (Neutral Milk Hotel, the Olivia Tremor Control, the Apples in Stereo, and of Montreal). United by a shared love of the group's music, they named Pet Sounds Studio in honor of the band. Rolling Stone writer Barry Walters wrote in 2000 that albums such as Surf's Up and Love You "are becoming sonic blueprints, akin to what early Velvet Underground LPs meant to the previous indie peer group." The High Llamas, Eric Matthews and St. Etienne are among the "alt heroes" who contributed cover versions of "unreleased, overlooked or underappreciated Wilson/Beach Boys obscurities" on the tribute album Caroline Now! (2000).

The Beach Boys remained among the most significant influences on indie rock into the late 2000s. Smile became a touchstone for many bands who were labelled "chamber pop", a term used for artists influenced by the lush orchestrations of Brian Wilson, Lee Hazlewood, and Burt Bacharach. Pitchfork writer Mark Richardson cited Smiley Smile as the origin point of "the kind of lo-fi bedroom pop that would later propel Sebadoh, Animal Collective, and other characters." The Sunflower track "All I Wanna Do" is also cited as one of the earliest precursors to chillwave, a microgenre that emerged in 2009.

Landmarks

 The Wilsons' California house, where the Wilson brothers grew up and the group began, was demolished in 1986 to make way for Interstate 105, the Century Freeway. A Beach Boys Historic Landmark (California Landmark No. 1041 at 3701 West 119th Street), dedicated on May 20, 2005, marks the location.
 On December 30, 1980, the Beach Boys were awarded a star on the Hollywood Walk of Fame, located at 1500 Vine Street.
 On September 2, 1977, the group performed before an audience of 40,000 at Narragansett Park in Pawtucket, Rhode Island, which remains the largest concert audience in Rhode Island history. In 2017, the street where the concert stage formerly stood was officially renamed to "Beach Boys Way".
 On September 21, 2017, The Beach Boys were honored by Roger Williams University and plaques were unveiled to commemorate the band's concert on September 22, 1971, at the Baypoint Inn & Conference Center in Portsmouth, Rhode Island. The concert was the first-ever appearance of South African Ricky Fataar as an official member of the band and Filipino Billy Hinsche as a touring member, essentially changing the Beach Boys' live and recording act's line-up into a multi-cultural group. Diversity is a credo of Roger Williams University, which is why they chose to celebrate this moment in the band's history.

MembersCurrent membersBrian Wilson – vocals, bass, keyboards  
Mike Love – vocals, percussion, saxophone, Electro-Theremin 
Al Jardine – vocals, guitar, bass  
Bruce Johnston – vocals, keyboards, bass Former membersCarl Wilson – vocals, guitars, keyboards, bass 
Dennis Wilson – vocals, drums, keyboards, percussion 
David Marks – vocals, guitars 
Blondie Chaplin – vocals, bass, guitars 
Ricky Fataar – vocals, drums, guitar, percussion TimelineNotable supporting musicians for both the Beach Boys' live performances and studio recordings included guitarist Glen Campbell, keyboardists Daryl Dragon and Toni Tennille (Captain & Tennille), and saxophonist Charles Lloyd.LineupsDiscography

Studio albums

 Surfin' Safari (1962)
 Surfin' U.S.A. (1963)
 Surfer Girl (1963)
 Little Deuce Coupe (1963)
 Shut Down Volume 2 (1964)
 All Summer Long (1964)
 The Beach Boys' Christmas Album (1964)
 The Beach Boys Today! (1965)
 Summer Days (And Summer Nights!!) (1965)
 Beach Boys' Party! (1965)
 Pet Sounds (1966)
 Smiley Smile (1967)
 Wild Honey (1967)
 Friends (1968)
 20/20 (1969)
 Sunflower (1970)
 Surf's Up (1971)
 Carl and the Passions – "So Tough" (1972)
 Holland (1973)
 15 Big Ones (1976)
 The Beach Boys Love You (1977)
 M.I.U. Album (1978)
 L.A. (Light Album) (1979)
 Keepin' the Summer Alive (1980)
 The Beach Boys (1985)
 Still Cruisin' (1989)
 Summer in Paradise (1992)
 Stars and Stripes Vol. 1 (1996)
 That's Why God Made the Radio (2012)

Selected archival releases

 The Pet Sounds Sessions (1997)
 Endless Harmony Soundtrack (1998)
 Ultimate Christmas (1998)
 Hawthorne, CA (2001)
 The Smile Sessions (2011)
 The Big Beat 1963 (2013)
 Keep an Eye on Summer 1964 (2014)
 Becoming the Beach Boys: The Complete Hite & Dorinda Morgan Sessions (2015)
 Beach Boys' Party! Uncovered and Unplugged (2015)
 1967 – Sunshine Tomorrow (2017)
 Wake the World: The Friends Sessions (2018)
 I Can Hear Music: The 20/20 Sessions (2018)
 Feel Flows: The Sunflower & Surf's Up Sessions 1969–1971 (2021)
 Sail On Sailor – 1972 (2022)

Selected filmography
 1965: The Girls on the Beach
 1965: The Monkey's Uncle 
 1976: The Beach Boys: Good Vibrations Tour
 1985: The Beach Boys: An American Band
 1996: The Beach Boys: Nashville Sounds
 1998: Endless Harmony: The Beach Boys Story
 2002: Good Timin': Live at Knebworth England 1980
 2003: The Beach Boys: The Lost Concert 1964
 2006: The Beach Boys: In London 1966
 2012: The Beach Boys: Chronicles
 2012: The 50th Reunion Tour

Notes

References

Bibliography

 
 
 
 
 
 
 
 
 
 
 
 
 
 
 
 
 
 
 
 
 
 
 
 
 
 
 
 
 
 
 
 
 
 
 
 
 
 
 
 
 
 
 
 
 
 
 

Further readingArticles 
 Books'''

 
 Berry, Torrence (2013). Beach Boys Archives, Volume 2. White Lightning Publishing. .
 Berry, Torrence (2014). Beach Boys Archives, Volume 5. White Lightning Publishing. .
 Berry, Torrence (2015). Beach Boys Archives, Volume 7. White Lightning Publishing. .
 Berry, Torrence and Zenker, Gary (2013). Beach Boys Archives, Volume 1. White Lightning Publishing. .
 Berry, Torrence and Zenker, Gary (2014). Beach Boys Archives, Volume 3. White Lightning Publishing. .
 Berry, Torrence and Zenker, Gary (2014). Beach Boys Archives, Volume 4. White Lightning Publishing. .
 Cox, Perry D. (2017). Price and Reference Guide for the Beach Boys American Records (By Perry Cox, Frank Daniels & Mark Galloway. Foreword by Jeffrey Foskett). Perry Cox Ent. .

External links 
 
 
 

 
1961 establishments in California
American pop music groups
American rock music groups
Brian Wilson
California Sound
Capitol Records artists
Carl Wilson
Dennis Wilson
Experimental pop musicians
Family musical groups
Grammy Lifetime Achievement Award winners
Musical groups established in 1961
Musical quintets
Musicians from Hawthorne, California
Psychedelic pop music groups
Psychedelic rock music groups from California
Reprise Records artists
Rock music groups from California
Sibling musical groups
Surf music groups
Warner Records artists